An angle-sensitive pixel (ASP) is a CMOS sensor with a sensitivity to incoming light that is sinusoidal in incident angle.

Principles of operation

ASPs are typically composed of two gratings (a diffraction grating and an analyzer grating) above a single photodiode. ASPs exploit the moire effect and the Talbot effect to gain their sinusoidal light sensitivity. According to the moire effect, if light acted as a particle, at certain incident angles the gaps in the diffraction and analyzer gratings line up, while at other incident angles light passed by the diffraction grating is blocked by the analyzer grating. The amount of light reaching the photodiode would be proportional to a sinusoidal function of incident angle, as the two gratings come in and out of phase with each other with shifting incident angle. The wave nature of light becomes important at small scales such as those in ASPs, meaning a pure-moire model of ASP function is insufficient. However, at half-integer multiples of the Talbot depth, the periodicity of the diffraction grating is recapitulated, and the moire effect is rescued. By building ASPs where the vertical separation between the gratings is approximately equal to a half-integer multiple of the Talbot depth, the sinusoidal sensitivity with incident angle is observed.

Applications

ASPs can be used in miniature imaging devices. They do not require any focusing elements to achieve sinusoidal incident angle sensitivity, meaning that they can be deployed without a lens to image the near field, or the far field using a Fourier-complete planar Fourier capture array. They can also be used in conjunction with a lens, in which case they perform a depth-sensitive, physics-based wavelet transform of the far-away scene, allowing single-lens 3D photography similar to that of the Lytro camera.

See also
Planar Fourier capture array

References

Image sensors
Integrated circuits